The Declaration of Facts was a widely distributed public statement issued by Jehovah's Witnesses during the period of persecution of the group in Nazi Germany. The document asserted the denomination's political neutrality, appealed for the right to publicly preach, and claimed the Witnesses were the victims of a misinformation campaign by other churches. It was prepared by Watch Tower Society president Joseph F. Rutherford and released at a convention in Berlin on June 25, 1933. More than 2.1 million copies of the statement were distributed throughout Germany, with copies also mailed to senior government officials including German Chancellor Adolf Hitler. Its distribution prompted a new wave of persecution against German Witnesses. 

The declaration is controversial among Jehovah's Witnesses and historians. It stated that Jehovah's Witnesses shared the same ethical goals as the Nazi party, and it attacked Hitler's favorite enemies: Jews, Catholics, the USA, Britain and France.  The declaration was first read at the 1933 District Convention of Jehovah's Witnesses in Berlin. According to biographer James Penton, the declaration was read in a hall decked with swastikas, and the convention opened with a song that shared the same air as the German national anthem, otherwise anathema for Jehovah's Witnesses.

Background

From 1922, German Bible Students (Ernste Bibelforscher) were arrested on charges of illegal peddling as they publicly distributed Watch Tower Society literature. Between 1927 and 1930, almost 5,000 charges were laid against members of the group, and although most ended in acquittals some "severe sentences" were also handed down.  In November 1931 Bavarian authorities used new emergency ordinances relating to political disturbances to confiscate and ban Watch Tower Society literature. By the end of 1932 more than 2,300 charges against Bible Students were pending.

Restrictions tightened with the appointment of Adolf Hitler as Germany's new Chancellor on January 30, 1933. On February 4 he issued a decree permitting the police to confiscate literature "endangering public order and security" and also restrict freedoms of assembly. By mid-1933 the work of the group–by then known as Jehovah's witnesses–had been banned in most German states, with members accused of being Communists and associating with the Jews in subversive political movements. Members' homes were frequently searched by police for incriminating literature and on April 24 the International Bible Students Association (IBSA) headquarters in Magdeburg was briefly occupied by police.

Authorities objected to the influence of religious minorities such as Jehovah's Witnesses because they "contributed to the ideological fragmentation of the German people", but they also viewed the group as a threat to the mainstream Christian denominations. A Ministry of the Interior decree stated:

In June Watch Tower Society president Joseph Rutherford and Nathan Knorr traveled to Berlin to attempt to negotiate the possibilities of continuing preaching activity in Germany. While there, they organized a public convention to be held in Berlin on June 25, 1933 to release a Declaration of Facts, which had been written by Rutherford. They hoped the document would convince Hitler, government officials and the public that Jehovah's Witnesses posed no threat to the German people and the state. The Declaration would assert the group's political neutrality and protest against the "meddling" of the Hitler government into the Witnesses' preaching work. It was to be translated into German by branch overseer Paul Balzereit and presented to the conventioners for adoption.

Both Rutherford and Knorr left Germany before the convention, held at the Wilmersdorfer Tennishallen, began. Though organizers expected an attendance of 5,000, a crowd of 7,000 arrived. The exterior of the hall was decked with swastikas, possibly placed by members of Nazi SS units who had celebrated nearby the previous day. To the surprise of those attending, the convention opened with a song, Zion's Glorious Hope, which was by then rarely sung at Witness meetings. Set to music composed by Joseph Haydn in 1797, it had been in the Bible Students' songbook since 1905, but avoided since 1922, when the same music was used with new lyrics for the German national anthem. During the convention, the 3,800-word Declaration of Facts was presented to the crowd and accepted by many in attendance. A "large number" of those attending, however, refused to adopt it and left the convention disappointed, viewing it as weaker than they expected. A 1974 Watch Tower Society publication claimed Balzereit had weakened the German translation of the Declaration, softening criticism of the Nazis, but in 1998 the society repudiated that statement.

Some 2.5 million copies of The Declaration, reproduced as a four-page pamphlet, were distributed publicly and a day after the convention, the declaration was sent to Hitler with a seven-page cover letter written by Balzereit in which he assured the Chancellor that the IBSA "was not in opposition to the national government of the German Reich". The letter added that, to the contrary, "the entirely religious, nonpolitical objectives and efforts of the Bible Students" were "completely in agreement with the corresponding goals of the national government". Historian Detlef Garbe concluded that by using subtle wording, Balzereit intended that the letter, while representing the Bible Students' teachings, could also be misinterpreted by the group's opponents.

Contents of the Declaration

The Declaration was divided into four broad sections: an introduction that broached the issues of opposition and oppression, sections addressing Watch Tower Society literature—which by 1933 was prohibited—and the League of Nations, and a concluding section called "Great Truths". Some statements within the Declaration written to highlight commonality with German national ideals subsequently attracted criticism that its authors had attempted to compromise with Hitler's regime and curry favor with the new government.

Introduction

The opening nine paragraphs stated that the members of the organization were peaceable and law-abiding, and were God's "witnesses to the truth". It further stated that they had been wrongly charged, and wished to present a true and faithful witness to officials about their role in God's purposes, appealing for a fair and impartial hearing. It said the Bible revealed that Satan the Devil was an enemy of God and that, as in Jesus' day, he used religious teachers and priests to distort the truth and foment opposition to his true representatives.

The statement said they had been falsely and maliciously accused of receiving financial support from the Jews, insisting: "There has never been the slightest bit of money contributed to our work by the Jews." It added:

Our Literature

The Declaration cited the accusation that Watch Tower Society literature constituted a danger to Germany's peace and safety, and suggested the publications had been misunderstood by officials because of the bluntness of much of the language, which had been originally written in the United States for an American readership. It said people in Britain and the United States had suffered, and continued to suffer, from "the misrule of Big Business and conscienceless politicians" supported by "political religionists", and the Society's literature had therefore employed plain language to convey that message. It drew parallels with similar oppression from which it said the German people suffered:

The Declaration asserted that Jehovah's Witnesses had no political ambitions or involvement, and did nothing to hinder the beliefs of others. It said members of the group had devoted their lives to helping people to properly understand the Bible as "the only possible way for the complete relief and blessing for mankind," which would in turn bring benefits to "the education, culture and upbuilding of the people." It stated that the Society and its literature therefore posed no menace to the nation's peace and safety because it supported the government's "high ideals".

The Literature section of the Declaration concluded by noting that the Watch Tower Society had for years made persistent efforts to do good for people, often with the help of financial assistance of American members.

League of Nations

The Declaration said Watch Tower Society statements about the League of Nations had been identified as a further cause for prohibition of preaching and literature distribution. It said, "Let us remind the government and the people of Germany that it was the League of Nations compact that laid upon the shoulders of the German people the great unjust and unbearable burdens." It added that Watch Tower Society publications had been critical of the League—which had been hailed by churches as part of God's purpose—because the Society considered the League to be oppressive and unfair, and unable to bring about the relief promised by the Bible. The Declaration further stated that Jehovah's Witnesses had not attempted to exert political influence, and that their criticisms could not be construed as a menace to the government or a danger to national peace and safety. The statement said the "political clergy, priests and Jesuits" had persecuted Witnesses in North America and Britain, and it warned that the same forces were similarly misrepresenting them to German authorities.

Great Truths

The Declaration summarized the eschatalogical beliefs of Jehovah's Witnesses, and said that Germans had suffered misery since 1914, becoming the victims of international injustice. It compared the goals of the organization with "the nationalists" who "have declared themselves against all such unrighteousness and announced that 'Our relationship to God is high and holy'" and said German Witnesses "fully endorse these righteous principles."

The statement praised the German government's adherence to those "high ideals" and expressed confidence that it would not deliberately resist the Witnesses' preaching work. It stated, "We therefore appeal to the high sense of justice of the government and nation and respectfully ask that the order of prohibition against our work and our literature be set aside, and the opportunity be given us to have a fair hearing before we are judged." In conclusion, it requested that the government establish an independent committee to meet delegates of the group to examine its literature and allow the Witnesses to work without hindrance.

Aftermath

Within days of sending the Declaration to Hitler, Balzereit left Germany and emigrated to Prague. On June 28, 30 Nazi Party storm troopers raided the Magdeburg offices for a second time, hoisting the swastika above the building, closing the factory, sealing the presses and locking the premises. The Ministry of the Interior said the action was designed to prohibit any future activities of the Watch Tower Society in Germany. In late August, authorities transported about 70 tonnes of Watch Tower literature and Bibles in 25 trucks to the city's outskirts and publicly burned them. In some areas the Witnesses defied the ban on their preaching activity, but throughout Germany many believers withdrew from the association and ceased all activity. When copies of the Watchtower and Golden Age began to arrive in Germany by mail from abroad, police ordered the confiscation of mail of known Jehovah's Witnesses.

In September 1934 a thousand German Jehovah's Witnesses joined a crowd of 3,500 at an international convention in Basel, Switzerland, organized under the theme "Fear Them Not". Rutherford urged the German Jehovah's Witnesses to resume their preaching activity and the attendees responded by declaring in a resolution that they would do so on October 7, 1934, regardless of the ban. The resolution also contained a message of protest against their treatment in Germany. The resolution was given to the Swiss press and a copy sent to Hitler, along with a message that read: "Your ill-treatment of Jehovah's Witnesses shocks all people on earth and dishonors God's name. Refrain from further persecution of Jehovah's Witnesses; otherwise God will destroy you and your national party." Thousands of telegrams containing the same warning were sent to the Reich government in Berlin from Witnesses in Europe, the United States and Britain on October 8 and 9 until foreign post offices were told to stop sending them because the recipient refused to accept them.

Balzereit later returned to Germany to resume his position as branch leader, but attracted criticism from some members over his reluctance to defy bans on public preaching. In May 1935 he—along with eight other officers—was arrested; at a trial in December that year he denied he had defied official decrees, but was sentenced to 2½ years imprisonment. The following year he was expelled from the Watch Tower Society, with Rutherford explaining in a letter to German Witnesses that he was surprised "not one of those on trial at that time gave a faithful and true testimony to the name of Jehovah". Rutherford said Balzereit had said nothing to show "his complete reliance on Jehovah" and the Society therefore "will henceforth have nothing to do with him". The Society would also "put forth no effort in seeking to release them from prison even if it had the power to do anything".

Historical assessment

German historian Detlef Garbe viewed the Declaration as part of the group's efforts to adapt at a time of increasing persecution. He said the use of the Zion's Glorious Hope hymn at the opening of the Berlin convention was an effort to make a good impression with the world and not a coincidence that the song shared the same melody as the German national anthem. He said the wording of the document presented the denomination as an organization with a positive attitude towards the German state and with common interests with the new rulers. Garbe said that in repudiating accusations that the Witnesses had received financial support from the Jews, the group "clearly distanced itself from another group under persecution". He noted the use of "anti-Jewish slogans" in the document, which was written less than three months after the boycott of Jewish stores in Germany, but said the Witnesses were not guilty of antisemitism. Yet Garbe said the Declaration's description of the Anglo-American empire as "the most oppressive empire on earth" did undermine the group's claims to political neutrality.

Garbe said later publications of the Watch Tower Society had misrepresented the Declaration as a "resolution of protest" and had also falsely claimed that Balzereit had "watered down" the society's publications in his translation of Rutherford's original document. He said the criticism of Balzereit in the Witnesses' 1974 Yearbook was an attempt to place responsibility on the German branch leader for the society's attempts to adapt.

Canadian historian Professor James Penton, a former Jehovah's Witness and critic of the group, claimed the Declaration was a compromising document that proves "that Watch Tower leaders were attempting to pander to the Nazis, for the Declaration of Facts and the letter to Hitler were in many ways saying exactly what the Nazis themselves were saying". Penton said the Declaration's "antisemitic" statements about Jews mirrored statements made in Hitler's Mein Kampf and Propaganda Minister Joseph Goebbels' 1927 essay Wir fordern as well as those published by Nazi propagandist Julius Streicher as the Jewish boycott began.

Penton said Balzereit's letter to Hitler accompanying the Declaration was "even more obsequious to the Fuhrer and to Nazi values than the Declaration of Facts":

In a five-page article in its Awake! magazine in 1998, the Watch Tower Society rejected accusations that it had attempted to curry favor with the Hitler regime or endorsed the Nazi's racist ideology. It said the Witnesses had not decorated the convention venue with swastikas or sung the German national anthem. It said:

The Society said the denunciation of "commercial Jews" in the Declaration "clearly did not refer to the Jewish people in general, and it is regrettable if it has been misunderstood and has given cause for any offense." It explained that Jehovah's Witnesses rejected antisemitic views, and that the "high ideals" they shared with the Nazis were those of family values and religious freedom.

Religious scholar Gabriele Yonan, who described the Declaration of Facts as a "petition", an "appeal" and a "sermon", said its text, in the context of the history of Jehovah's Witnesses during the Nazi regime, had nothing to do with antisemitic statements and currying favor with Hitler, adding, "These accusations made by today's church circles are deliberate manipulations and historical misrepresentations." Yonan said the Declaration did not address Hitler as "Fuhrer" and did not conclude with the words "Heil Hitler", as was the case at the time in most official church documents addressed to state authorities. She said the absence of influence by the antisemitic terminology of the period was evident from the Declarations free use of Old Testament quotations that include the term "Zion".

See also 

 Persecution of Jehovah's Witnesses in Nazi Germany

References

External links
Declaration of Facts, English translation

1933 documents
1933 in Christianity
20th-century Christian texts
Persecution of Jehovah's Witnesses
The Holocaust in Germany
Jehovah's Witnesses literature